Bochkarev, Botchkarev or Bochkaryov (from bochkar meaning cooper) is a Russian masculine surname, its feminine counterpart is Bochkareva, Botchkareva or Bochkaryova. It may refer to

Arkady Bochkaryov (1931–1988), Soviet basketball player
Maria Bochkareva (1889–1920), Russian military commander
Natalya Bochkareva (born 1980), Russian stage and film actress
Sergei Viktorovich Bochkarev (born 1941), Russian mathematician
Vasily Bochkarev (born 1949), Russian politician
Viatcheslav Botchkarev (born 1968), Russian sports shooter
Yelyzaveta Bochkaryova (born 1978), Ukrainian track cyclist
Yevgeniya Bochkaryova (born 1980), Russian gymnast 
V.I. Bochkarev (died 1923) White Cossack officer in the Russian Civil War; Governor of Kamchatka for the Provisional Priamurye Government: fought in the Yakut Revolt under Mikhail Korobeinikov

See also
19915 Bochkarev, an asteroid
Bochkarev Brewery, a Russian brewer now part of Heineken

Russian-language surnames